IP networks are divided logically into subnetworks. Computers in the same subnetwork have the same address prefix. For example, in a typical home network with legacy Internet Protocol version 4, the network prefix would be something like 192.168.1.0/24, as expressed in CIDR notation.

With IPv4, commonly home networks use private addresses (defined in ) that are non-routable on the public Internet and use address translation to convert to routable addresses when connecting to hosts outside the local network. Business networks typically had manually provisioned subnetwork prefixes. In IPv6 global addresses are used end-to-end, so even home networks may need to distribute public, routable IP addresses to hosts.

Since it would not be practical to manually provision networks at scale, in IPv6 networking, DHCPv6 prefix delegation is used to assign a network address prefix and automate configuration and provisioning of the public routable addresses for the network. The way this works for example in case of a home network is that the home router uses DHCPv6 protocol to request a network prefix from the ISP's DHCPv6 server. Once assigned, the ISP routes this network to the customer's home router and the home router starts advertising the new addresses to hosts on the network, either via SLAAC or using DHCPv6.

DHCPv6 Prefix Delegation is supported by most ISPs who provide native IPv6 for consumers on fixed networks.

Prefix delegation is generally not supported on cellular networks, for example LTE or 5G. Most cellular networks route a fixed /64 prefix to the subscriber. One of the reasons why cellular networks may not yet support prefix delegation is that the operators want to use prefixes they can aggregate to a single route. To solve this,  defines an optional mechanism and the related DHCPv6 option to allow exclusion of one specific prefix from a delegated prefix set.

See also
 
 
 
 
 
 

Computer networks
IPv6